CHMG-DT (channel 10) is a low-power independent community television station in Quebec City, Quebec, Canada, owned by Télé-Mag inc. The station's studios are located on Jean-Perrin Street, along Autoroutes 40/73 in Les Rivières, and its transmitter is located at Place de la Cité in Sainte-Foy.

CHMG-DT is branded on air as Télé-Mag, which is a portmanteau of "television" and "magazine".

History

Télé-Mag first broadcast in 1979 as cable-only "Télé-Plus 24"; it was renamed "Télé-Mag 24" in 1994. The "24" in the name represented the cable channel position at the time, on channel 24; it has since moved to channel 10.

In August 2003, the Canadian Radio-television and Telecommunications Commission (CRTC) granted Télé-Mag a low-power terrestrial broadcast licence on channel 9, under the calls CHMG-TV. Broadcasting only at 38 watts, the broadcast station launched on October 20, 2005.

Technical information

Subchannel

Analogue-to-digital transition
The station began broadcasting in high-definition via cable television in December 2010.

As CHMG-TV's transmitter is low power, it was not subject to the required analogue television shutdown and digital conversion, which took place on August 31, 2011. The station flash-cut to digital sometime in 2020.

References

External links
 
CHMG-TV history - Canadian Communication Foundation

HMG
Canadian community channels
Television channels and stations established in 1979
1979 establishments in Quebec